Aeromonas piscicola is a Gram-negative, catalase and oxidase-positive bacterium of the genus Aeromonas isolated from diseased fish in Spain

References

External links
Type strain of Aeromonas piscicola at BacDive -  the Bacterial Diversity Metadatabase

Aeromonadales
Bacteria described in 2010